Flaminio Sosa Ovelar (born 24 January 1946 in Caraguatay, Paraguay) is a former footballer. He played at centre back position.

Honours

Club
 Guarani
 Paraguayan Primera División: 1964, 1967, 1969
 Olimpia
 Paraguayan Primera División: 1978, 1979, 1980, 1981
 Copa Libertadores: 1979
Copa Interamericana: 1979
Intercontinental Cup: 1979

Titles

References

1946 births
Living people
Paraguayan footballers
Paraguay international footballers
Copa América-winning players
1979 Copa América players
Club Guaraní players
Club Olimpia footballers
Association football defenders